Paelabang Danapan (born 18 December 1953), also known as Sun Ta-chuan, is an aboriginal Taiwanese educator and politician. He had served as Minister of the Council of Indigenous Peoples from 2009 to 2013 and Vice President of the Control Yuan from 2014 to 2020. Sun is a member of the Puyuma tribe in Taiwan, and is also a Roman Catholic.

Education
Paelabang Danapan received his bachelor's degree in Chinese literature from National Taiwan University, and bachelor's degree in philosophy from Fu Jen Catholic University. He then earned his doctoral degree in sinology from Catholic University of Louvain in Belgium.

Early career
Before entering the political world, Paelabang Danapan was a professor at the National Chengchi University in Taipei and Professor of Indigenous Language and Communication at National Dong Hwa University.

References

1953 births
Living people
Puyuma people
Taiwanese Members of the Control Yuan
National Taiwan University alumni
Fu Jen Catholic University alumni
KU Leuven alumni
Academic staff of the National Dong Hwa University
Government ministers of Taiwan
Taiwanese expatriates in Belgium
Taiwanese politicians of indigenous descent
Academic staff of the National Chengchi University
Taiwanese Catholics